Strandella is a genus of Asian sheet weavers that was first described by R. Oi in 1960.

Species
 it contains five species, found in Korea, China, Japan, and Russia:
Strandella fluctimaculata Saito, 1982 – Russia, Japan
Strandella paranglampara Barrion, Barrion-Dupo & Heong, 2013 – China
Strandella pargongensis (Paik, 1965) – Russia, China, Korea, Japan
Strandella quadrimaculata (Uyemura, 1937) (type) – Japan
Strandella yaginumai Saito, 1982 – Japan

See also
 List of Linyphiidae species (Q–Z)

References

Araneomorphae genera
Linyphiidae
Spiders of Asia
Spiders of Russia